Ctenothrips is a genus of thrips in the family Thripidae. There are about 10 described species in Ctenothrips.

Species
These 10 species belong to the genus Ctenothrips:
 Ctenothrips barapatharensis
 Ctenothrips bridwelli Franklin, 1907
 Ctenothrips distinctus (Uzel, 1895)
 Ctenothrips frosti Moulton, 1929
 Ctenothrips guizhouensis
 Ctenothrips kwanzanensis Takahashi, 1937
 Ctenothrips niger Kudo
 Ctenothrips nonnae Haga & Okajima, 1989
 Ctenothrips smilax Bhatti
 Ctenothrips transeolineae Chen, 1979

References

Further reading

 
 
 
 
 
 
 

Thripidae
Articles created by Qbugbot